Clyde Huntus Van Sickle (May 26, 1907 – February 15, 1995) was a guard in the National Football League. He first played with the Frankford Yellow Jackets during the 1930 NFL season. After a year away from the NFL, he played two seasons with the Green Bay Packers.

References

1907 births
1995 deaths
People from Pryor Creek, Oklahoma
Frankford Yellow Jackets players
Green Bay Packers players
American football guards
Arkansas Razorbacks football players